Picayune is an obsolete term for a coin of small value. Its meaning has been extended to the figurative sense of "trivial" or "of little value".

Picayune may also refer to:

The Times-Picayune, a daily newspaper published in New Orleans, Louisiana, United States
The Bloom Picayune, a fictional newspaper appearing in the Bloom County cartoon strip
Picayune, Mississippi, a city in the southern United States
Picayune station, an Amtrak station in Picayune, Mississippi
Picayune Creek, a river in Iowa
Picayune Strand State Forest, a protected area near Naples, Florida, United States
John "Picayune" Butler, an influential black entertainer who lived in 19th-century New Orleans
Picayune cigarettes, a strong-tasting now-defunct brand previously marketed by Liggett & Myers Tobacco Company
Picayune Rancheria of Chukchansi Indians, the home of a federally recognized tribe of indigenous people of California